In the Heat of Passion is a 1992 American thriller film.

External links

Review of film at Los Angeles Times
Review of film at Entertainment Weekly

1992 films
American thriller films
1992 thriller films
1990s English-language films
Films directed by Rodman Flender
1990s American films